James Bogen is an American science philosopher currently at University of Pittsburgh and an Elected Fellow of the American Association for the Advancement of Science.

References

Fellows of the American Association for the Advancement of Science
21st-century American philosophers
University of Pittsburgh faculty
Living people
Year of birth missing (living people)